Columbia Energy Center is a base load, sub-bituminous coal-fired, electrical power station located south of Portage in the Town of Pacific, Columbia County, Wisconsin. Ownership is 46.2% Wisconsin Power and Light Company (Alliant Energy), 31.8% Wisconsin Public Service (Integrys Energy Group), and 22% Madison Gas and Electric (MGE).

History 
Columbia Energy Center was built in the early 1970s. Unit 1 went online in 1975 and Unit 2 went online in 1978, with nameplate capacities of 512 MW and 511 MW, respectively.

In 2009, faced with environmental regulations regarding future operations, the owners of Columbia Energy Center invested in upgrades to the plant. The owners submitted an Electric Generation Expansion Analysis System (EGEAS) summary report to the Public Service Commission of Wisconsin on April 2, 2009. The report presented the results of a planning and scenarios analysis to support Wisconsin Power and Light, Wisconsin Public Service Corporation, and MGE's joint application for a Certificate of Authority (CA) for the installation of emission controls at the facility.

Although not required by law, the Commission held a hearing on the matter of the upgrade after several parties, including the Citizens Utility Board (CUB), Clean Wisconsin (Clean WI), and the Sierra Club, filed a joint request to intervene.

Columbia's owners were granted a Certificate authorizing the installation of air emissions reductions systems and associated equipment on March 11, 2011, at an estimate cost of $627 million. Construction began on April 16, 2012, and was completed in December 2014 at a total cost of $589 million.

On February 2, 2021, Alliant Energy, the majority owner and operator of the Columbia Energy Center announced the plant will shut down by 2025. On June 23, 2022, Alliant announced that CEC's decommissioning date would be delayed until mid-2026, due to the ongoing supply chain issues and to hedge against an energy shortage in upcoming years, with CEC mainly being in service during peak periods.

Electricity generation 
In 2021, Columbia Energy Center generated 5,907 GWh, approximately 9.4% of the total electric power generated in Wisconsin (62,584 GWh) for that year. The plant had a 2021 annual capacity factor of 65.91%.

See also

List of power stations in Wisconsin

References

External links
Scorecard Environmental Release Report: COLUMBIA ENERGY CENTER

Energy infrastructure completed in 1978
Buildings and structures in Columbia County, Wisconsin
Coal-fired power stations in Wisconsin
Alliant Energy